The Silence in Black and White is the debut studio album by the American rock band Hawthorne Heights, and their first release after changing their name from A Day in the Life.

Background and recording
Writing for the album commenced shortly after the band changed their name from A Day In the Life to Hawthorne Heights. The band had sent around 35 separate press kits to several potential record labels, receiving interest from a few of them, including Victory Records. Victory to had sent the band two generic response letters a month apart; drummer Eron Bucciarelli subsequently emailed the label and told them what the band had been doing since the letters' arrival. Founder Tony Brummel contacted them the following day, asking when he could see them in person. Six days after this, they played a showcase for the label, who gave them an offer shortly afterwards. A month after this, all of the members quit their day jobs to focus on the band full-time. They recorded their debut album at Smart Studios in Madison, Wisconsin and at Big Gold Studios in Chicago, Illinois. The sessions were done over 15-hour days across a five-week period. The recordings were mixed at Gravity Studios before the album was mastered by Dominick Maita at Airshow Mastering with Pro Tools engineer Dan Duszynski.

Composition and lyrics
Musically, the sound of The Silence in Black and White has been described as emo, post-hardcore
and screamo. Woodruff said the name of "Life on Standby" referred to being in a touring band, having to "put your entire life on standby to try your hardest". He added that it acted as a valuable introduction to the band as a whole as it has "parts that are both dark and light". Woodruff wrote "Dissolve and Decay" for a friend of his that was having relationship issues, specifically being unfaithful to another friend of his. "Niki FM" was written after Woodruff read various album reviews in preparation for the response to the band's album. He noticed a theme where "every band I liked was getting torn apart" critically. It included a reference to Say Anything... (1989), which was Woodruff's all-time favorite film. "The Transition" was the first song they wrote after changing their name; the title alludes to this change. Part of its lyrics were influenced by Woodruff's girlfriend who had been studying in Europe for three months. The lyrics to "Blue Burns Orange" were re-written in the studio; Woodruff remarked that during the making of the album, none of the band members were sleeping or eating properly "so my dreams were really crazy. I just remember dreaming in black and white a bunch and really noticing it".

"Silver Bullet" is titled after the 1986 movie of the same name, which was Woodruff's favorite horror film. He had written the lyrics while doing two jobs and attending college concurrently, and "felt like [the band] was going nowhere but a lot of things convinced me to stay with it". Discussing "Screenwriting an Apology", Woodruff explained that movies can sometimes convey messages better than words. Some of its lyrics deal with Woodruff being irrational, while others are about his girlfriend being irrational. "Ohio Is for Lovers" talks about the band members' girlfriends, all of which lived in Ohio, who Woodruff wanted to pay homage to. "Wake Up Call" talks about Woodruff being insecure as a musician, knowing that his lyricism was going to be scrutinized. Discussing "Sandpaper and Silk", Woodruff said a person once "described our music as a great blend of sandpaper and silk. I thought that was kind of neat". It dealt with the music scene in Dayton, Ohio, and people that started hating the band as soon as they signed to Victory Records. "Speeding Up the Octaves" is about an on-and-off friendship that Woodruff had where his friend would become addicted to a substance, get clean and be addicted again.

Release
In May and June 2004, the band went on tour with Alexisonfire, Silverstein, and Emery. It was released on June 8, 2004 through Victory Records. The album was the label's highest selling debut at the time of its release. Two music videos were produced, one for "Ohio is For Lovers" in 2004, and one for "Niki FM" in 2005. They went on an East Coast US tour with Bayside, Burning Bright and the Break in September 2004. In November and December 2004, the band supported A Static Lullaby on their headlining US tour.

Hawthorne Heights embarked on their first headlining US tour in January 2005 with Number One Fan and labelmates Spitalfield and the Black Maria. In February and March 2005, the group supported Sugarcult on the US Take Action Tour. In May 2005, they shot a music video for "Niki FM" with director Major Lightner. A two-disc CD and DVD special edition was released on June 14, 2005, containing demo and acoustic versions of the tracks, live performances, and a documentary with footage of the band. "Niki FM" was released to radio on September 27, 2005.

Reception and legacy

The album peaked at  56 on the Billboard top 200 chart, No. 1 on the Billboard Heatseekers Albums Chart, and No. 4 on the top independent album chart. The album has been certified gold status by the Recording Industry Association of America. Before the release of their second album If Only You Were Lonely in February 2006, The Silence in Black and White had sold over 720,000 copies.

The band released a special acoustic 10th Anniversary release of the album, with all tracks being redone acoustically. Journalists Leslie Simon and Trevor Kelley included the album in their list of the most essential emo releases in their book Everybody Hurts: An Essential Guide to Emo Culture (2007). Alternative Press ranked "Ohio Is for Lovers" at number 88 on their list of the best 100 singles from the 2000s.

Track listing

Personnel
Personnel per booklet.

Hawthorne Heights
 Eron Bucciarelli – drums
 Casey Calvert – guitar, unclean vocals
 Micah Carli – guitar
 Matt Ridenour – bass guitar, backing vocals
 JT Woodruff – lead vocals, guitar

Additional musicians
 Grace Carli – additional vocals (tracks 4, 5 and 9)

Production and design
 Dominick Maita – mastering
 Dan Dusyznski – Pro Tools engineer
 Jonathan Willoughby – band photo
 Jason Link – layout

Charts

Weekly charts

Year-end charts

Certifications

References
Citations

Sources

 
 

Hawthorne Heights albums
Victory Records albums
2004 debut albums